Liu Xiang (77–6BCE), born Liu Gengsheng and bearing the courtesy name Zizheng, was a Chinese astronomer, historian, poet, politician, librarian, and writer of the Western Han Dynasty. Among his polymathic scholarly specialties were history, literary bibliography, and astronomy. He is particularly well known for his bibliographic work in cataloging and editing the extensive imperial library.

Life
Liu Gengsheng was born in Xuzhou. Being a distant relative of Liu Bang, the founder of the Han dynasty, he was thus a member of the ruling dynastic clan (the Liu family). Liu Xiang's father ranked as a marquess. Liu Xiang's son, Liu Xin, would continue the scholarly tradition of his father and his relative Liu An (the Prince of Huainan).

By the beginning of Han Yuandi's reign, Liu Xiang was a member of a group of Confucian officials, including Xiao Wangzhi, who wished to limit the power of the emperor's female family members relatives' clans, the Shi and the Xu. He ended up on the losing side of a power struggle between the powerful eunuch's Hong Gong and Shi Xian. Briefly imprisoned, Liu Xiang was terminated from his official position, and he received no new appointments to the office for the next fifteen years.

The succession of Emperor Cheng to the imperial throne was accompanied by a realignment of power among the various factions involved in government, and Liu Xiang was able to revive his official prospects. In 26 BCE, at the command of the emperor, Liu Xiang spent much of the rest of the 20-odd years of his life engaged in the massive bibliographic work of organizing the imperial library. This work was assisted by his son, Liu Xin, who finally completed the task after his father's death.

Works
Liu compiled the first catalogue of the imperial library, the Abstracts  Bielu), and is the first known editor of the Classic of Mountains and Seas (Shanhaijing), which was finished by his son. Liu also edited collections of stories and biographies, including the Strategies of the Warring States (Zhanguoce), the New Prefaces (Xinxu), the Garden of Stories (Shuoyuan), and the Biographies of Exemplary Women (Lienüzhuan). He has long erroneously been credited with compiling the Biographies of the Immortals (Liexian Zhuan), a collection of Taoist hagiographies and hymns.

Liu Xiang was also a poet. He is credited with the "Nine Laments" ("Jiu Tan") that appears in the Songs of Chu.

See also
Confucian classics
Guodian Chu Slips
Liu An
Science and technology of the Han Dynasty
Sima Qian
Sima Tan

Notes

References
 Fei, Zhengang, "Liu Xiang". Encyclopedia of China (Philosophy Edition), 1st ed.
 Hawkes, David, translator and introduction (2011 [1985]). Qu Yuan et al., The Songs of the South: An Ancient Chinese Anthology of Poems by Qu Yuan and Other Poets. London: Penguin Books. 
 Loewe, Michael. (1986). "The Former Han Dynasty," in The Cambridge History of China: Volume I: the Ch'in and Han Empires, 221 B.C. – A.D. 220, 103–222. Edited by Denis Twitchett and Michael Loewe. Cambridge: Cambridge University Press. .

External links

 

6 BC deaths
1st-century BC Chinese historians
1st-century BC Chinese philosophers
1st-century BC Chinese astronomers
Chinese librarians
Chinese Confucianists
Han dynasty historians
Han dynasty poets
Han dynasty politicians from Jiangsu
Han dynasty science writers
Historians from Jiangsu
Politicians from Xuzhou
Scientists from Xuzhou 
Writers from Xuzhou